Igor Sergeyevich Yurganov (born 10 December 1993) is a Russian football player. He plays for PFC Sochi.

Club career
He made his debut in the Russian Second Division for  FC Metallurg-Kuzbass Novokuznetsk on 12 May 2012 in a game against FC Irtysh Omsk.

He made his debut in the Russian Premier League for PFC Sochi on 21 July 2019 in a game against FC Zenit Saint Petersburg.

On 7 October 2020 he joined FC Baltika Kaliningrad on loan for the 2020–21 season.

Career statistics

References

External links
 
 

1993 births
People from Rubtsovsk
Sportspeople from Altai Krai
Living people
Russian footballers
Association football defenders
FC Novokuznetsk players
FC Irtysh Omsk players
FC Sibir Novosibirsk players
FC Avangard Kursk players
FC Volgar Astrakhan players
FC Dynamo Saint Petersburg players
PFC Sochi players
FC Tambov players
FC Baltika Kaliningrad players
Russian Premier League players
Russian First League players
Russian Second League players